Bassanite is a calcium sulfate mineral with formula CaSO4·H2O or 2CaSO4·H2O. In other words it has half a water molecule per CaSO4 unit, hence its synonym calcium sulfate hemihydrate.

Bassanite was first described in 1910 for an occurrence on Mount Vesuvius. It was named for Italian paleontologist Francesco Bassani (1853–1916).

At Vesuvius it occurs as alterations from gypsum within leucite tephrite and as fumarole deposits. It occurs in dry lake beds in California and Australia. It also occurs interlayered with gypsum in caves.

H. Schmidt and coinvestigators reported in 2011 that under dry conditions, the structure is monoclinic with space group C2, but at 75% humidity, the structure is trigonal with space group P3221. This reflects the incorporation of additional water of hydration, such that the trigonal form has the formula CaSO4·0.625H2O

References

Sulfate minerals
Monoclinic minerals
Minerals in space group 5
Minerals in space group 152 or 154
Mount Vesuvius
Geology of Italy